Row Heath is a hamlet on Rectory Road in the Tendring district, in the county of Essex, England. The hamlet is near the A133 road between Weeley Heath and St Osyth Heath.

Hamlets in Essex
St Osyth